Ivan Yuryevich Reyzvikh (born 21 December 1981) is a former Russian professional football player.

Club career
He played in the Russian Football National League for FC Metallurg-Kuzbass Novokuznetsk in 2008.

References

External links
 

1981 births
Sportspeople from Tver
Living people
Russian footballers
Association football midfielders
FC Novokuznetsk players
FC Znamya Truda Orekhovo-Zuyevo players